Eduard Freiherr von der Heydt (September 26, 1882 – April 3, 1964) was a German and Swiss banker, art collector and patron.

Biography
He was born in Elberfeld, Germany and died in Ascona Switzerland. His collections were the basis for the creation of the Museum Rietberg in Zürich, Switzerland. He was also the former owner of the Monte Verità, a well known site of many different Utopian and cultural events and communities, which upon his death became the property of the Swiss Canton of Ticino. He was also a member of the NSDAP until he became a Swiss citizen in 1937 and left the party in 1939. After the Second World War, he was accused of treason in 1946, but later in 1948 declared innocent. He described art using the term "ars una", an all encompassing art that appreciates diversity as it is found throughout the world.

Ancestry

Works 

 Eduard von der Heydt/Werner von Rheinbaben: Auf dem Monte Verità. Erinnerungen und Gedanken über Menschen, Kunst und Politik, Atlantis, Zürich 1958.

Further reading 

 Karl With: Bildwerke Ost-und Südasiens aus der Sammlung Yi Yuan [d.i. Eduard von der Heydt]. Mit begleitendem Text von K. With. Einband u. Vorsatzpapier nach Entwurf von Georg Baus. Schwabe, Basel 1924 
 Robert Landmann (d.i. Werner Ackermann): Monte Verità. Die Geschichte eines Berges, Berlin: Adalbert Schultz Verlag 1930. 
 Stefan Balazs: Die Inschriften der Sammlung Baron Eduard von der Heydt, Sonderdruck aus der Ostasiatischen Zeitschrift. 20. Jahrgang. De Gruyter & Co Verlag, Berlin 1934.
 Curt Riess: Ascona. Geschichte des seltsamsten Dorfes der Welt. Zürich: Europa Verlag 1964 (1. Aufl.), 1977 (3. Aufl.) - In this book Eduard von der Heydt is referred to as "Mr. X" beginning on page 194
 Sabine Fehlemann und Stamm, Rainer (Hrsg.): Die Von der Heydts. Bankiers, Christen und Mäzene. Müller + Busmann, Wuppertal 2001, 184 S., 
 Francesco Welti: „Der Baron, die Kunst und das Nazigold“, Verlag Huber Frauenfeld, 2008, 
 Eberhard Mros: Phänomen Monte Verità. Neun Bände, im Selbstverlag des Verfassers, Ascona 2008/2011
 Karl Schem: Wuppertal untersuchte Nazi-Verquickungen seines Ehrenbürgers / NSDAP-Baron ein moderner Till Eulenspiegel? auf der Seite Neue Rheinische Zeitung, Online-Flyer Nr. 94 vom 9. Mai 2007
 Eberhard Illner (Hrsg.): Eduard von der Heydt. Kunstsammler – Bankier – Mäzen. Prestel, München/London/New York 2013, . (Accompanies the exhibit Von Buddha bis Picasso. Der Sammler Eduard von der Heydt at the Museum Rietberg Zürich, April 20 – August 18, 2013 and also accompanies another exhibit at the Von der Heydt-Museum, Wuppertal, from October 13, 2015 - February 28, 2016.)

References

External links 
Searchable online database of the Museum Rietberg, including von der Heydt's collection
Section in German about provenance research happening at the Museum Rietberg regarding von der Heydt's collection
Link to von der Heydt exhibition at the Museum Rietberg

1882 births
1964 deaths
German bankers
Swiss bankers
People from Elberfeld
Nazi Party members
German art collectors
20th-century art collectors
Businesspeople from Wuppertal